A fluidized bed reactor (FBR) is a type of reactor device that can be used to carry out a variety of multiphase chemical reactions. In this type of reactor, a fluid (gas or liquid) is passed through a solid granular material (usually a catalyst) at high enough speeds to suspend the solid and cause it to behave as though it were a fluid. This process, known as fluidization, imparts many important advantages to an FBR. As a result, FBRs are used for many industrial applications.

Basic principles
The solid substrate material (the catalytic material upon which chemical species react)  in the fluidized bed reactor is typically supported by a porous plate, known as a distributor. The fluid is then forced through the distributor up through the solid material. At lower fluid velocities, the solids remain in place as the fluid passes through the voids in the material. This is known as a packed bed reactor. As the fluid velocity is increased, the reactor will reach a stage where the force of the fluid on the solids is enough to balance the weight of the solid material. This stage is known as incipient fluidization and occurs at this minimum fluidization velocity. Once this minimum velocity is surpassed, the contents of the reactor bed begin to expand and swirl around much like an agitated tank or boiling pot of water. The reactor is now a fluidized bed. Depending on the operating conditions and properties of solid phase various flow regimes can be observed in this reactor.

History and current uses
Fluidized bed reactors are a relatively new tool in the chemical engineering field. The first fluidized bed gas generator was developed by Fritz Winkler in Germany in the 1920s. One of the first United States fluidized bed reactors used in the petroleum industry was the Catalytic Cracking Unit, created in Baton Rouge, LA in 1942 by the Standard Oil Company of New Jersey (now ExxonMobil). This FBR and the many to follow were developed for the oil and petrochemical industries. Here catalysts were used to reduce petroleum to simpler compounds through a process known as cracking. The invention of this technology made it possible to significantly increase the production of various fuels in the United States.

Today, fluidized bed reactors are still used to produce gasoline and other fuels, along with many other chemicals. Many industrially produced polymers are made using FBR technology, such as rubber, vinyl chloride, polyethylene, styrenes, and polypropylene. Various utilities also use FBRs for coal gasification, nuclear power plants, and water and waste treatment settings. Used in these applications, fluidized bed reactors allow for a cleaner, more efficient process than previous standard reactor technologies.

Advantages
The increase in fluidized bed reactor use in today's industrial world is largely due to the inherent advantages of the technology.
 Uniform particle mixing: Due to the intrinsic fluid-like behavior of the solid material, fluidized beds do not experience poor mixing as in packed beds. This complete mixing allows for a uniform product that can often be hard to achieve in other reactor designs. The elimination of radial and axial concentration gradients also allows for better fluid-solid contact, which is essential for reaction efficiency and quality.
 Uniform temperature gradients: Many chemical reactions require the addition or removal of heat. Local hot or cold spots within the reaction bed, often a problem in packed beds, are avoided in a fluidized situation such as an FBR. In other reactor types, these local temperature differences, especially hotspots, can result in product degradation. Thus FBRs are well suited to exothermic reactions. Researchers have also learned that the bed-to-surface heat transfer coefficients for FBRs are high.
 Ability to operate reactor in continuous state: The fluidized bed nature of these reactors allows for the ability to continuously withdraw product and introduce new reactants into the reaction vessel. Operating at a continuous process state allows manufacturers to produce their various products more efficiently due to the removal of startup conditions in batch processes.

Disadvantages
As in any design, the fluidized bed reactor does have its draw-backs, which any reactor designer must take into consideration.
 Increased reactor vessel size: Because of the expansion of the bed materials in the reactor, a larger vessel is often required than that for a packed bed reactor. This larger vessel means that more must be spent on initial capital costs.
 Pumping requirements and pressure drop: The requirement for the fluid to suspend the solid material necessitates that a higher fluid velocity is attained in the reactor. In order to achieve this, more pumping power and thus higher energy costs are needed. In addition, the pressure drop associated with deep beds also requires additional pumping power.
 Particle entrainment: The high gas velocities present in this style of reactor often result in fine particles becoming entrained in the fluid. These captured particles are then carried out of the reactor with the fluid, where they must be separated. This can be a very difficult and expensive problem to address depending on the design and function of the reactor. This may often continue to be a problem even with other entrainment reducing technologies.
 Lack of current understanding: Current understanding of the actual behavior of the materials in a fluidized bed is rather limited. It is very difficult to predict and calculate the complex mass and heat flows within the bed. Due to this lack of understanding, a pilot plant for new processes is required. Even with pilot plants, the scale-up can be very difficult and may not reflect what was experienced in the pilot trial.
 Erosion of internal components: The fluid-like behavior of the fine solid particles within the bed eventually results in the wear of the reactor vessel. This can require expensive maintenance and upkeep for the reaction vessel and pipes.
 Pressure loss scenarios: If fluidization pressure is suddenly lost, the surface area of the bed may be suddenly reduced.  This can either be an inconvenience (e.g. making bed restart difficult), or may have more serious implications, such as runaway reactions (e.g. for exothermic reactions in which heat transfer is suddenly restricted).

Current research and trends
Due to the advantages of fluidized bed reactors, a large amount of research is devoted to this technology. Most current research aims to quantify and explain the behavior of the phase interactions in the bed. Specific research topics include particle size distributions, various transfer coefficients, phase interactions, velocity and pressure effects, and computer modeling. The aim of this research is to produce more accurate models of the inner movements and phenomena of the bed. This will enable chemical engineers to design better, more efficient reactors that may effectively deal with the current disadvantages of the technology and expand the range of FBR use.

See also
 Chemical engineering
 Chemical looping combustion
 Chemical reactor
 Fluidized bed combustion
 Siemens process

References

Chemical reactors
Industrial processes
Fluidization